Alan Bartram (1932  –  2013) was a British graphic designer and historian of design and lettering.

Career 
Bartram studied painting and typography and became a graphic designer, working for Lund Humphries and IBM. He researched the history of British vernacular design and lettering, publishing books on traditional British tombstones, shop and street name lettering as well as on book typography.

While working at Lund Humphries, Bartram worked with James Sutton to make An Atlas of Typeforms.  This book was 16 x 10 inches and It was published by Lund Humphries in 1967.

Bartram's series of books on lettering was published by Lund Humphries. Lettering in Architecture was published in 1975. Then in 1978, Fascia Lettering in the British Isles, Street Name Lettering in the British Isles, and Tombstone Lettering in the British Isles, was published. The final book, English Lettering Tradition, was published in 1989. This series is recognized for its sparsely illustrations and monochrome photographs done by Bartram. 

In 1990, Bartram and Sutton worked together again to made Typefaces for Books. This book is significant because it demonstrated the correlation between typeface, size, and line spacing.

References

1932 births
2013 deaths
British typographers and type designers
British graphic designers
British art historians